Blanquet was an Indian Scout in the United States Army and a recipient of the U.S. military's highest decoration, the Medal of Honor, for his actions in the Indian Wars of the western United States.

An Apache born in Arizona, Blanquet served as a scout for General George Crook during the Apache Wars. For his participation in campaigns through the winter of 1872–1873, he was awarded the Medal of Honor two years later, on April 12, 1875.

Blanquet's official Medal of Honor citation reads:
Gallant conduct during campaigns and engagements with Apaches.

See also

List of Medal of Honor recipients for the Indian Wars
List of Native American Medal of Honor recipients

References

External links

19th-century births
Year of death missing
People of pre-statehood Arizona
Apache people
United States Army soldiers
Native American people of the Indian Wars
United States Army Medal of Honor recipients
United States Army Indian Scouts
American Indian Wars recipients of the Medal of Honor
Native American people from Arizona